Halenia serpyllifolia is a species of plant in the Gentianaceae family. It is endemic to Ecuador.  Its natural habitat is subtropical or tropical high-altitude grassland.

References

serpyllifolia
Endemic flora of Ecuador
Endangered plants
Endangered biota of South America
Taxonomy articles created by Polbot